69 is a 2004 film adaptation of Ryu Murakami's novel 69.

Plot
Sasebo, Nagasaki, Japan, 1969: Inspired by the iconoclastic examples of Dylan, Kerouac, Godard and Che, a band of mildly disaffected teenagers led by the smilingly charismatic Ken (Tsumabuki Satoshi) decide to shake up "the establishment," i.e., their repressive school and the nearby US military installation. A series of anarchic pranks meets with varying levels of success, until Ken and company focus their energies on mounting a multimedia "happening" to combine music, film and theater. Complications ensue.

Cast
 Satoshi Tsumabuki as Kensuke "Ken" Yazaki
 Masanobu Andō as Tadashi "Adama" Yamada
 Yuta Kanai as Manabu Iwase
 Asami Mizukawa as Mie Nagayama
 Rina Ohta as Kazuko "Lady Jane" Matsui
 Yoko Mitsuya as Yumi Sato
 Hirofumi Arai as Bancho
 Hideko Hara as Kenichi's mother
 Ittoku Kishibe as Matsunaga sensei
 Jun Kunimura as Sasaki
 Kyohei Shibata as Ken's father
 Kenny Scott as Military Officer

References

External links 

  

2004 films
2000s Japanese-language films
Films directed by Sang-il Lee
2004 drama films
Toei Company films
Films with screenplays by Kankurō Kudō
Films based on Japanese novels
Japanese drama films
2000s Japanese films